Hui Zicheng (Simplified Chinese:, born 2 June 1989) is a Chinese sports shooter. He competed in the men's 50 metre rifle three positions event at the 2016 Summer Olympics.

References

External links
 
 

1989 births
Living people
Chinese male sport shooters
ISSF rifle shooters
Olympic shooters of China
Shooters at the 2016 Summer Olympics
Sport shooters from Guangdong
Shooters at the 2018 Asian Games
Asian Games gold medalists for China
Medalists at the 2018 Asian Games
Asian Games medalists in shooting
People from Qingjian County
21st-century Chinese people